Eupithecia recintoensis is a moth in the family Geometridae. It is found in the Region of Biobio (Nuble Province) in Chile. The habitat consists of the Northern Valdivian Forest Biotic Province.

The length of the forewings is about 7 mm for females. The forewings are unicolorous brownish grey. The hindwings are slightly paler than the forewings, except distally. Adults have been recorded on wing in December.

Etymology
The specific name is based on the type locality.

References

Moths described in 1987
recintoensis
Moths of South America
Endemic fauna of Chile